Dioselina Valderrama Reyes (born 28 April 1984) is an American-born Mexican former footballer who played as a midfielder for the Mexico national team at the 2004 Summer Olympics. At the club level, she played for Bonita Rebel.

See also
 Mexico at the 2004 Summer Olympics

References

External links
 
 

1984 births
Living people
American sportspeople of Mexican descent
Citizens of Mexico through descent
American women's soccer players
Mexican women's footballers
Soccer players from San Diego
Women's association football midfielders
Mexico women's international footballers
Olympic footballers of Mexico
Footballers at the 2004 Summer Olympics
21st-century American women